Tomba kanssa is a town and sub-prefecture in the Siguiri Prefecture in the Kankan Region of northern Guinea.

Administrative subdivision 
Tomba Kanssa is made up of six districts.

History 

Tomba Kanssa is a sub-prefecture of Guinea created in 2021 and attached to the prefecture of Siguiri in the Kankan region.

Education 

In partnership with Nordgold, management, the Dinguiraye Mining Company (SMD) is building a technical arts and crafts school in Tomba Kanssa, this NAFA Center (literacy and trade learning center) will contribute to strengthening  capacity through functional literacy, training and apprenticeship programs for women and young girls in the sub-prefectures of Tomba Kanssa The objective is to facilitate access to education and improve the quality  of education, thus contributing to the fulfillment of the requirements of the government's sectoral policy in the field of education, which has identified as priorities the development of school, recreational and educational infrastructures,

Population 
In 2016, the number of inhabitants is estimated at 36,965, based on an official extrapolation of the 2014 census which had counted 32,867 inhabitants.

References

Sub-prefectures of the Kankan Region
Populated places in the Kankan Region